Ashley M. Rivera Suárez (born 18 July 1995) is a Puerto Rican footballer who plays as a defender. She has been a member of the Puerto Rico women's national team.

International career
Rivera capped for Puerto Rico at senior level during the 2016 CONCACAF Women's Olympic Qualifying Championship.

References

1995 births
Living people
Women's association football defenders
Puerto Rican women's footballers
Puerto Rico women's international footballers